The Matchmaker is a 1954 play by Thornton Wilder, a rewritten version of his 1938 play The Merchant of Yonkers.

History

The play has a long and colorful history. John Oxenford's 1835 one-act farce A Day Well Spent had been extended into the full-length play  Einen Jux will er sich machen by Austrian playwright Johann Nestroy in 1842. In 1938, Wilder adapted Nestroy's version into the Americanized comedy  The Merchant of Yonkers, which attracted the attention of German director Max Reinhardt, who mounted a Broadway production, which ran for 39 performances.

Fifteen years later, director Tyrone Guthrie expressed interest in a new production of the play, which Wilder extensively rewrote and rechristened The Matchmaker. The most significant change was the expansion of a previously minor character named Dolly Gallagher Levi, who became the play's centerpiece. A widow who brokers marriages and other transactions in Yonkers, New York at the turn of the 20th century, she sets her sights on local merchant Horace Vandergelder, who has hired her to find him a wife. After a series of slapstick situations involving mistaken identities, secret rendezvous behind carefully placed screens, separated lovers, and a trip to night court, everyone finds themselves paired with a perfect match.

Productions

The play starring Ruth Gordon as Dolly and Sam Levene as Horace Vandergelder, debuted at the Edinburgh Festival in Scotland on November 4, 1954; at the Edinburgh Festival, in Berlin—for the troops and at the Theatre Royal Haymarket in London's West End. Due to a salary dispute with Broadway producer David Merrick, Sam Levene left the production after playing the role of Horace Vandergelder for over a year in Europe. Loring Smith replaced Levene as Horace Vandergelder and opened on Broadway December 5, 1955 at the Royale Theatre, later transferring to the Booth to complete its run of 486 performances. Ruth Gordon's performance in the title role earned her a Tony Award nomination as Best Actress; Guthrie won as Best Director.

Characters and original Broadway cast
The characters and original cast of The Matchmaker are recorded at the Internet Broadway Database.
Horace Vandergelder, a Merchant of Yonkers – Loring Smith
Mrs. Dolly Gallagher Levi, a Friend of Vandergelder's Late Wife – Ruth Gordon
Irene Molloy, a Milliner – Eileen Herlie
Minnie Fay, Mrs. Molloy's Assistant – Rosamund Greenwood
Cornelius Hackl, a Clerk in Vandergelder's Store – Arthur Hill
Barnaby Tucker, an Apprentice in Vandergelder's Store – Robert Morse
Ermengarde, Mr. Vandergelder's niece, whom Ambrose wants to marry — Prunella Scales
Miss Flora Van Husen, a Friend of Vandergelder's Late Wife – Esme Church
Malachi Stack – Patrick McAlinney
Ambrose Kemper, an Artist – Alexander Davion
Gertrude, Vandergelder's Housekeeper – Charity Grace
Miss Van Husen's Cook – Christine Thomas
Rudolf, a Waiter – William Lanteau
Joe Scanlon, a Barber – Philip Leeds
August, a Waiter –  John Mulligan

Adaptations

The 1958 film version, adapted by John Michael Hayes and directed by Joseph Anthony, starred Shirley Booth as Dolly, Anthony Perkins as Cornelius, Shirley MacLaine as Irene, Paul Ford as Vandergelder, and Robert Morse reprising his Broadway role as Barnaby.

The story enjoyed yet another incarnation in 1964 when David Merrick, who had produced the 1955 Broadway play, partnered with composer Jerry Herman to mount the hugely successful, Tony Award-winning musical  Hello, Dolly! starring Carol Channing.

A film version of Hello, Dolly! was released in 1969 starring Barbra Streisand in the lead role.

See also
 On the Razzle, 1981 farce by Tom Stoppard also based on the 1842 musical Einen Jux will er sich machen

References

External links

The Matchmaker Plot Summary and Critical Analysis, by the Thornton Wilder Society

1954 plays
Broadway plays
Plays by Thornton Wilder
Plays set in the 19th century
Plays set in New York City
Plays based on other plays
American plays adapted into films
Culture of Yonkers, New York
A Day Well Spent